You Are Here is an album by Banco de Gaia. It was released on May 18, 2004, by Six Degrees Records.

Track listing

References

2004 albums
Banco de Gaia albums
Six Degrees Records albums